Möwe (German for 'gull') or Mowe may refer to:

 Möwe (DJ duo), an Austrian DJ-duo from Vienna
 Mowe Lake, a lake in Delta County, Michigan
 Dittmar HD 153 Motor-Möwe, a 1953 West German light aircraft
 Focke-Wulf A 17 Möwe, a 1920s airliner produced in Germany
 Focke-Wulf A 38 Möwe, a 1930s airliner produced in Germany
 German torpedo boat Möwe, a 1926 torpedo boat built for the German Navy
 Ostfriesische Möwe, a German breed of domestic chicken
 , a German gunboat
 , a German commerce raider during World War I
 Möwe, an aircraft in the anime Nausicaä of the Valley of the Wind

People with the surname
 Jenny Mowe (born 1978), American basketball player
 Ray Mowe (1889–1968), American baseball player